The sixth season of Supermodel Me (or Supermodel Me: Revolution) aired on 11 October 2021 after a 7-year hiatus, with the shooting location being moved back to Singapore. The previous judging panel were mostly replaced by the judging panel of Asia's Next Top Model, with Thai model Cindy Bishop appointed as the host and head judge, and Yu Tsai appointed as the creative consultant. Ase Wang returned to the judging panel for the fourth time. The show marked as the debut of Hanli Hoefer and Catriona Gray (finale episode) in the show's judging panel. Asia's Next Top Model alumni Dana Slosar and Monika Santa Maria were added as the task master.

This season features 12 contestants; three from the Philippines, two each from Singapore and Vietnam, and one each from China, Hong Kong, Indonesia, Malaysia and Thailand. The prizes for this season are a Subaru Ambassadorship, a cover on Harper’s Bazaar and a modelling contract with Storm Model Management.

The winner was 21-year-old Nguyễn Quỳnh Anh from Vietnam.

This season is available to watch through streaming platform Netflix from December 2, 2022.

This season won Best Editing at the  Asian Academy Creative Awards 2022 on December 7, 2022.

Contestants 
(Ages stated are at time of contest)

Results

Call-out order 

  The contestant won the task-challenge
  The contestant was eliminated
  The contestant won the task-challenge and was eliminated
  The contestant won the competition

Photo shoot guide
Episode 1 photoshoot: Survival of The Fiercest: Fly Fearless with La Perla Lingerie
Episode 2 photoshoot: Time to Transform: Sugar & Spice Inside Singapore's First Museum of Ice Cream
Episode 3 photoshoot: Raising The Heat: Get Wet & Wild on Sentosa Infinity Pool
Episode 4 photoshoot: Fast Forward: Supreme Machine with Subaru Forester
Episode 5 photoshoot: Total Knock Out: Steal The Chinese Opera Show
Episode 6 photoshoot: Beast Unleashed: Delicate Bare Beauty in The Wetland Pond
Episode 7 photoshoot: Rule The World: Roll Striking with Finest Handcrafted KrisShop Collection
Episode 8 photoshoot: Be The Fantasy: Fairy Muse Out of The Woodland
Episode 9 photoshoot: The Fast Lane: Light, Camera & Action with Subaru Outback
Episode 10 photoshoot: Final Showdown: Flaunt The Shifty Look of Disco Generation

Average call-out order

Bottom three/two

 The contestant was eliminated after their first time in the bottom two/three
 The contestant was eliminated after their second time in the bottom two/three
 The contestant was eliminated after their third time in the bottom two/three 
 The contestant was eliminated in the first round of elimination and placed third
 The contestant was eliminated and placed as the runner-up

Notes

References

External links
Official website

2021 Singaporean television seasons